This is a list of mythological characters who appear in narratives concerning the Trojan War.

Armies

* See Catalogue of Ships

** See Trojan Battle Order

Individuals

Deaths and outcome of war 
This table lists characters killed during the war, and who was responsible for their deaths. Legend: survivors of the war = (✓), unknown fate = (?) and unknown killer or unexplained cause of death = (†)

See also
Catalogue of Ships
Achaean Leaders
Trojan Battle Order
Trojan Horse
List of Homeric characters
List of children of Priam

External links 

Timeless Myths - Trojan War A full summary of the Trojan War.
The Legend of the Trojan War
Mythology: Timeless Tales of Gods and Heroes by Edith Hamilton

Characters in the Aeneid
Characters in the Iliad
Characters in Greek mythology
Trojan War characters